Plan Saugey is a locality of the municipality of Bex, in Switzerland.

References 

Subdivisions of the canton of Vaud